Dragán Ivanov (born 27 January 1942) is a Hungarian athlete. He competed in the men's triple jump at the 1968 Summer Olympics.

References

1942 births
Living people
Athletes (track and field) at the 1968 Summer Olympics
Hungarian male triple jumpers
Olympic athletes of Hungary
Place of birth missing (living people)
Universiade medalists in athletics (track and field)
Universiade silver medalists for Hungary
Medalists at the 1965 Summer Universiade
20th-century Hungarian people